The Dongli Story House is a rice mill in Fuli Township, Hualien County, Taiwan.

History
The building is a rice mill which was originally established in 1899 named Dongli Rice Factory. In the 1950s, the factory moved to its current bigger location due to the increase in rice production. In the 1970s, the factory began to produce organic rice due to the trend at that time. Later on, the Dongli Story House was established at the premise to preserve the historical artifacts of rice cultivation from the earlier times.

Transportation
The factory is accessible within walking distance south of Dongli Station of Taiwan Railways.

See also
 Taiwanese cuisine

References

1899 establishments in Taiwan
Buildings and structures in Hualien County
Industrial buildings in Taiwan
Rice production